Nils Brembach (born 23 February 1993) is a German racewalker. He competed in the 20 kilometres walk event at the 2015 World Championships in Athletics in Beijing, China. At the 2016 Summer Olympics, he competed in the men's 20 km walk. He finished in 38th place with a time of 1:23:46. In 2019, he competed in the men's 20 kilometres walk at the 2019 World Athletics Championships held in Doha, Qatar. He did not finish his race.

See also
 Germany at the 2015 World Championships in Athletics

References

1993 births
Living people
Place of birth missing (living people)
German male racewalkers
Olympic male racewalkers
Olympic athletes of Germany
Athletes (track and field) at the 2016 Summer Olympics
Athletes (track and field) at the 2020 Summer Olympics
World Athletics Championships athletes for Germany
German national athletics champions